Andrew Park (born January 2, 1980) is a former professional tennis player from the United States.

Career
As a junior, Park and partner Travis Parrott made the doubles semi-finals at the 1997 Orange Bowl and the boys' doubles quarter-finals at the 1998 Australian Open. He won the USTA National Closed Championships in 1998.

Park, who played collegiate tennis at the University of Southern California, was given a wildcard into the 1998 US Open main draw. He lost in the opening round to Mikael Tillström, in straight sets.

References

1980 births
Living people
American male tennis players
Tennis people from California
USC Trojans men's tennis players